The Network Time Protocol daemon (ntpd) is an operating system program that maintains the system time in synchronization with time servers using the Network Time Protocol (NTP).

Description
The ntpd program is an operating-system daemon that sets and maintains a computer system's system time in synchronization with Internet-standard time servers. It is a complete implementation of the Network Time Protocol (NTP) version 4, but retains compatibility with versions 1, 2, and 3 as defined by RFC 1059, RFC 1119, and RFC 1305, respectively. ntpd performs most computations in 64-bit floating point arithmetic and uses 64-bit fixed point operations only when necessary to preserve the ultimate precision, about 232 picoseconds. While ordinary workstations and networks cannot achieve the ultimate precision , future processors and networks may require it.

xntpd is the Network Time Protocol version three (1992) daemon software. The "x" was added to the name because the branch of code that eventually became NTPv3 was "experimental". The name of the software changed back to "ntpd" for version four because the inventor of NTP, Dave Mills, decided that something probably should not remain "experimental" for about twenty years in the absence of dramatic change.

ntpd uses a single configuration-file to run the daemon in server and/or client modes.  The configuration file, usually named ntp.conf,  is located in the /etc directory.  Other important files include the drift file, which ntpd uses to correct for hardware-clock skew in the absence of a connection to a more accurate upstream time-server.

Implementations

NTP implementations
NTP (RFC 5905):
 The NTP Reference Implementation from The NTP Project at the University of Delaware.
 Windows Port of NTPD – Free Windows port of The NTP Reference Implementation from http://www.ntp.org with an easy-to-use installer
 NTPsec a hardened implementation derived from NTP Classic, Dave Mills's original.
 chrony – chronyd implements the NTP protocol and can act as either a client or a server.
 OpenNTPD – A portable Simple NTPD implementation by the OpenBSD group

Simple NTP (SNTP) implementations
SNTP (RFC 4330):
 clockspeed – A simplest available and secure suite of NTP/SNTP client, clock skew eliminator, and precise time synchronization server and client
 dntpd – A simple client ntpd in DragonFly BSD
 ConnMan – ConnMan contains an NTP implementation.
 BusyBox, since version 1.16.2, has included an SNTP client and server based on OpenNTP.
 systemd-timesyncd – A Linux and systemd specific client implementation of SNTP.

See also
rdate
timed

References
 ntpd - Network Time Protocol (NTP) daemon Mills, D. L. The University of Delaware, USA. 2005. (Date Accessed: 19 August 2005)

External links
 Official NTP Documentation for the current development release
 The NTP Forum
 NTP Community Support Information
 NTP Development Collaboration
 NTP Mailing Lists
 NTP Software and Documentation Archive
 NTP Documentation Archive for current development and all stable releases of the NTP codebase
 OpenNTP manual pages
 How To: CentOS / Red Hat Linux Configure an NTP Client And Server
 Generic Linux notes
 Setting up NTP on Windows
 Setting up NTP thoroughly by Chronolabs Cooperative
 Setting up on Linux/Windows/Macintosh the NTP Servers Pooling

Network time-related software